The 2014 United States House of Representatives election in Guam will be held on Tuesday, November 4, 2014 to elect the non-voting Delegate to the United States House of Representatives from Guam's at-large congressional district. The election will coincide with the elections of other federal and state offices, including the 2014 Guamanian gubernatorial election.

The non-voting delegate is elected for a two-year term. Incumbent Democratic Delegate Madeleine Bordallo, who has represented the district since 2003, was re-elected. She filed for re-election on June 29, 2014.

Candidates

Democratic
 Madeleine Bordallo, incumbent Delegate
 Matthew Pascual Artero, current realtor from Artero Realty.

Republican
 Margaret Metcalfe as a Republican National committeewoman.

Withdrew
 Former Senator Frank Blas, Jr., Guam Senate Minority Leader and son of former Lieutenant Governor Frank Blas.
 Former Governor Felix P. Camacho

Results

Democratic primary results

Congresswoman Bordallo's Democratic challenger, Karlo Dizon, endorsed her for re-election following the primary.

Republican primary results

General election

See also
 United States House of Representatives election in Guam, 2012

References

Guam
2014
2014 Guam elections